Johann Friedrich Henckel (1 August 1678 – 26 January 1744) was a Prussian physician, chemist, metallurgist, and mineralogist. He taught chemistry and mineralogy at the Bergakademie Freiberg where his students included A. S. Marggraf, M.V. Lomonosov and Dmitri Vinogradov.

Henckel was born in Merseburg, the son of physician Johann Andreas and Anna Dorothea. After schooling at Merseburg Cathedral School (1685–94) he studied theology and medicine at Jena from 1698 after which he became a physician in Dresden. He received a doctorate in 1711 and moved to Freiberg where he began to collect minerals along with Christlieb Ehregott Gellert. In 1728 he was elected into the Leopoldina Academy. He moved back to Dresden in 1730 and began to work on minerals. He examined the chemistry of pyrites and believed in the formation of minerals through various processes such as crystallization and thereby rejected instantaneous Creation.

Henckel was also a specialist on tuberculosis.

References

External links 

 Flora Saturnizans (1755)
 Kleine minerologische und chymische Schriften (1756)
 Pyritologia (1757, English translation) 

1678 births
1744 deaths
German chemists